Dağlıca is a village in Yüksekova District of Hakkâri Province in southeastern Turkey. It is located by the river Oramar, a tributary of the Great Zab. The village is populated by Kurds of the Oramar tribe and had a population of 628 in 2022.

Dağlıca has the hamlets of Akar, Avasan, Beğendik, Bozkaya, Demirli, Genişdere, Gökağaç, İncirlik, Köyiçi, Ortaklar, Sivrice and Üçkardeş attached to the village. The unpopulated village of İkiyaka and its likewise unpopulated four hamlets of Berkevi, Molya Yasin, Rezuk and Gundi juri are situated southeast of Dağlıca.

There were Church of the East churches of Mar Mamo and Mar Daniel situated in the village.

History
According to local tradition, Mar Mamo fled persecution and became a hermit at Oramar. Mamo collected all snakes in the region and placed them in a pit, upon which he constructed a sanctuary, and it was believed it could heal snake and dog bites, as well as scorpion stings. The church of Mar Mamo was constructed in the 4th century. It has been suggested that it was built on the site of a pre-Christian shrine. Oramar was formerly exclusively inhabited by Assyrians, who were rayets (vassals) of the ashiret (free men) Jilu clan.

Most of the Assyrian population in the village was forcibly supplanted by Kurds, and the church of Mar Daniel was converted into a mosque at the end of the 19th century. Oramar was the seat of a kaza in the sanjak of Hakkari in the vilayet of Van, which was inhabited by 14,000 Kurds, 11,040 Assyrians, and 870 Turks in 1900, for a total of 25,910 people. At that time, 400 people inhabited the village, including 40 Assyrians who belonged to the Church of the East and were served by the diocese of Jilu.

By the time of the Sayfo during the First World War, the village was controlled by Suto, agha (chief) of the Kurdish Oramar tribe, who actively participated in the mass slaughter of Assyrian Christians in the region, and used Oramar as his headquarters. However, he spared the Assyrians in the village as they were responsible for the maintenance of the church of Mar Mamo, which was considered sacred by the Kurds also, and it was feared the snakes would return if the priests or the church were harmed.

The Assyrians retaliated against Suto and, in early September 1917, he was besieged at Oramar by an army led by Agha Petros whilst an army led by the brother of the Patriarch of the Church of the East Shimun XIX Benyamin attacked from another direction, killing 16 and capturing 30 Kurds, and suffered one death and two wounded. The village had fallen to the Assyrian forces by the time an additional force led by the patriarch arrived, but Suto and a number of Kurds fled to Nervi. Assyrian women who had been held captive by Suto were released from his harem, and Assyrian forces under the patriarch's command pursued Suto westward whilst Agha Petros marched east.

Population 
Population history from 2000 to 2022:

References

Bibliography

 
 
 
 
 
 
 
 

Villages in Yüksekova District
Kurdish settlements in Hakkâri Province
Historic Assyrian communities in Turkey
Places of the Assyrian genocide